Navraj Singh Goraya (born November 3, 1989), known professionally as Nav (stylized in all caps), is a Canadian rapper, singer, songwriter, and record producer. He began his career as a producer, co-producing fellow Canadian rapper Drake's single "Back to Back" in 2015. He then gained mainstream attention in 2016 when his song "Myself" went viral. Nav is signed to the Weeknd's record label XO Records and Republic Records, and is managed by label managers Amir "Cash" Esmailian and Wassim "Sal" Slaiby.

Nav released his self-titled debut mixtape, as well as his collaborative mixtape, Perfect Timing, with American record producer Metro Boomin, in 2017. Nav released his debut studio album, Reckless, in 2018. He then released his second studio album, Bad Habits (2019), which debuted at number one on the US Billboard 200. In 2020, Nav released his highest-charting song as a lead artist, "Turks", with Gunna featuring Travis Scott, which debuted and peaked at number 17 on the Billboard Hot 100. It serves as the lead single to his third studio album, Good Intentions (2020), which was released later and then became his second number-one album on the US Billboard 200. Soon, he released its deluxe edition titled Brown Boy 2 (2020), which is also a sequel of his unofficial EP titled Brown Boy (2019), which Cash published on Audiomack a week before Bad Habits. He then earned his highest-charting song in total from his feature alongside Don Toliver and Gunna on record label Internet Money single "Lemonade", which eventually peaked at number 6 on the Hot 100. He released the commercial mixtape Emergency Tsunami in November 2020, which debuted at number six on the US Billboard 200 chart.

Early life
Navraj Singh Goraya was born on November 3, 1989, in Rexdale, Ontario, into an immigrant Indian Punjabi Sikh family, from Punjab, India. He was raised in the Rexdale neighbourhood. His mother was involved in computer manufacturing and his father operated a forklift. Nav first became interested in music after his mother bought him a boombox in the third grade. His uncle was also a popular Punjabi singer in India and brought him to a studio. He began making mash-ups in high school and producing beats for local underground Toronto artists, and became popular on SoundCloud. Nav first started producing using Sony's ACID Pro software. He attended West Humber Junior Middle School and then later attended Thistletown Collegiate Institute for his high school education and had to spend an additional year to graduate. Following high school, he attended and graduated from Metalworks Institute in Mississauga, Ontario in 2010 with a diploma in Audio Production and Engineering.

Career

2015–2018: Commercial debut, Nav, Perfect Timing, and Reckless
In July 2015, Nav co-produced fellow Canadian rapper Drake's single "Back to Back". In 2016, his song "The Man" was played on Drake's OVO Sound Radio. On September 4, 2015, Nav released one of his earliest songs to his SoundCloud account, "Take Me Simple", which has accumulated over ten million listens. On January 12, 2016, he released the song "Myself", to SoundCloud and YouTube, which quickly became his biggest song at the time, earning him numerous cosigns, including from American model and internet personality Kylie Jenner. Following these songs, Nav was signed to XO and Republic Records, after being called by his now-manager Amir "Cash" Esmailian. 

On September 2, 2016, Nav was featured on (and solely produced) American rapper and singer Travis Scott's song "Beibs in the Trap", as part of the latter's second studio album, Birds in the Trap Sing McKnight. It peaked at number 90 on the US Billboard Hot 100, and by July 2017, had been certified 2× platinum by the Recording Industry Association of America (RIAA) after selling over two million copies.

On February 15, 2017, Nav released the single "Some Way", featuring fellow Canadian singer and label boss The Weeknd, which would be the lead single from his debut self-titled mixtape. It was released nine days later, on February 24, and also included "Myself".

On July 14, 2017, Nav and American record producer Metro Boomin released two singles, "Perfect Timing (Intro)" and "Call Me", which serves as the dual lead singles to their collaborative mixtape, Perfect Timing. The mixtape was released exactly a week later on July 21, 2017, which featured the likes of Lil Uzi Vert, Playboi Carti, Offset, 21 Savage, Belly, and Gucci Mane.

In February 2018, Nav received a Juno Award nomination for Breakthrough Artist of the Year at the Juno Awards of 2018. On April 24, 2018, during his "Freshman Tour", Nav announced at his Los Angeles concert that he was working on a project that would soon be released a month later known as Reckless and that him and Metro Boomin would be teaming up once again to make a sequel to Perfect Timing, which would be known as Perfect Timing 2. On May 18, 2018, Nav released his debut studio album Reckless through XO Records and Republic Records. It features guest appearances from Quavo, Travis Scott, Lil Uzi Vert, and Gunna. The project featured the song, "Wanted You" featuring Lil Uzi Vert, which became Nav's first single as a leading artist to chart on the Billboard Hot 100, peaking at number 64. On November 2, 2018, Nav released his final single of the year, titled "Know Me".

2019–present : Yearly releases and Demons Protected by Angels 
Nav received two Juno Award nominations for Fan Choice and Rap Recording of the Year at the Juno Awards of 2019. On March 22, 2019, Nav released his second studio album Bad Habits on XO Records and Republic Records. The album features guest appearances from Meek Mill, Young Thug, The Weeknd, Gunna, and Lil Durk. The lead single is "Know Me", which was released back in 2018. It debuted number one on the US Billboard 200. A few days later on March 26, 2019, Nav released the deluxe edition  of Bad Habits, featured additional guest appearances from Future and 88Glam, and all the songs from Brown Boy. The track "Habits" was supposed to feature Lil Uzi Vert and appear on the standard edition, but Uzi's label refused to clear the sample, which ended up in Nav recording Uzi's verse himself, and then releasing it on the deluxe edition. According to Nav, he recorded Lil Uzi Vert's verse himself and put it on the song.

On March 27, 2020, Nav and Gunna released the collaborative single, "Turks", featuring Travis Scott, which was the lead single for Nav's third studio album, Good Intentions. It is Nav's highest-charting song as a lead artist. The album was released on May 8, 2020, and debuted at number one on the US Billboard 200. It features guest appearances from Young Thug, Future, Gunna, Travis Scott, Lil Uzi Vert, late rapper Pop Smoke, Don Toliver, and Lil Durk. Three days later, on May 11, 2020, he released its deluxe edition titled Brown Boy 2, which also serves as a sequel to his unofficial EP, Brown Boy, which his manager Cash released exclusively on Audiomack. It features additional guest appearances from Quavo and Lil Duke. Soon after the release of Good Intentions and Brown Boy 2, Nav released a merchandise collaboration with Vlone and Virgil Abloh related to the album.

On August 14, 2020, Nav was featured alongside Don Toliver on the single "Lemonade" by record label Internet Money and Gunna. The song serves as the lead single to the label's debut studio album, B4 the Storm. It earned Nav his highest-charting song in total, eventually peaking at number 7 on the Hot 100.

On November 6, 2020, Nav released the commercial mixtape, Emergency Tsunami, after teasing it for a month. It is mainly produced by American record producer Wheezy, along with side help from other fellow producers. It features guest appearances from Gunna, Young Thug, Lil Baby, Lil Keed, and SahBabii. The mixtape was re-released five days later on November 11, 2020, with an additional guest appearance from Future.

In July 2022, Nav disclosed his fourth studio album would be titled Demons Protected by Angels. On July 29, 2022, Nav released the album's lead single titled "Never Sleep" with Lil Baby, featuring Travis Scott, with the album being released in August.

Controversies
In June 2017, Nav had received backlash from some members of his musical audience for usage of the word "nigga" in his songs such as on "My Mind", "TTD", and other songs. In an interview with Genius, Nav stated that the neighborhood he grew up in of Rexdale is very "multicultural" with members of the "Chinese to white to black to Jamaican" openly using the term with one another. He stated that it was commonly used among his friends, but once he had gotten global exposure, Nav said he started seeing some backlash. In this interview, Nav had stated that he would no longer use this term in his music anymore, and that people would not hear it on his then-upcoming collaboration project with Metro Boomin, Perfect Timing.

In March 2018, Nav had publicly criticized XXL through a series of tweets and Instagram posts along with releasing the single, "Freshman List". His main reason for criticizing the magazine was due to not being selected for the 2018 freshman cover. In his tweets, Nav shared his thoughts that had ranged "from angry and bitter to motivational and inspirational". After his tweets and release of the single, Nav began addressing the outlet's editor-in-chief Vanessa Satten through now deleted Instagram posts and further continued to criticize the outlet.

In August 2018, Nav featured on Travis Scott's third studio album, Astroworld, on the song "Yosemite" alongside fellow rapper Gunna. He was the subject of many memes mocking his feature; Nav's four vocal lines at the end of the song were initially mixed at a very low volume. Nav himself shared a meme on his Instagram. Scott and producer Mike Dean later confirmed this was an error, and re-mixed and re-released the track on streaming services with the updated vocal mix a week after the release of the song and album.

In March 2019 during an interview with Pitchfork, Nav expressed his frustration stating that "Fame is something I want, it's a good problem to have. I'm still not there, because when I walk out of fucking Delilah in L.A. and TMZ will be standing out there with cameras and not even take a picture of me, I get sick. I get in my fucking Lambo truck right in front of them. All my jewelry on and they don't even take one picture." However, he later clarified that this was taken out of context, as "sick" is in fact a positive term in Toronto slang, and rather than being disgusted for not being recognized, he is grateful to still have anonymity as a celebrity. Nav further stated in the Pitchfork interview that he hoped his latest project, Bad Habits would help him become more noticed by TMZ along with other paparazzi. A week later, TMZ found Nav in New York and did a brief video interview with him, asking him questions about his chain-snatching situation with Lil Uzi Vert.

Discography

Studio albums
 Reckless (2018)
 Bad Habits (2019)
 Good Intentions (2020)
 Demons Protected by Angels (2022)

Awards and nominations

References

1989 births
Living people
21st-century Canadian male singers
21st-century Canadian rappers
21st-century Indian singers
Canadian contemporary R&B singers
Canadian hip hop record producers
Canadian hip hop singers
Canadian male rappers
Canadian male singer-songwriters
Canadian musicians of Indian descent
Canadian people of Punjabi descent
Indian hip hop singers
Indian male singer-songwriters
Indian rappers
Indian record producers
People from Etobicoke
Rappers from Toronto
Republic Records artists
Trap musicians
Twitch (service) streamers
XO (record label)